Jacob (Jaap) Frederik Klinkhamer (born 21 June 1854 in Amsterdam; died 12 December 1928 in The Hague) was a Dutch architect and professor of architecture. He designed several buildings in the Netherlands, Dutch East Indies and South Africa.

Career
Klinkhamer studied in Delft at the then Polytechnic, where in 1878 he graduated as a civil engineer.  He started in 1882 as an independent architect in Amsterdam. With Dolf van Gendt he designed the Granary Korthals Altes (ca. 1895). He designed railroad building including Main II (Utrecht, ca. 1893), an office building for the NISM (Semarang, circa 1902) and the station building of Soestdijk and Baarn Station (both about 1897). He also designed villas and houses. Several of his works are recognized as significant. He worked with John Springer, B.J. Ouëndag and Cosman Citroen. From 1905 to 1 September 1924 he was Professor of Civil Engineering in Delft.

He married Margaret Elizabeth Bosscha, daughter of the professor / director John Bosscha Jr. and they had six children. He died at the age of 76 years in The Hague and was cremated in Westerveld.

Works
Headquarters of the Dutch East Indian Railway in Semarang
Station Soestdijk (ca. 1897)
Goods shed belonging to Station Soest (ca. 1897)
Monumental villa in The Hague (c.1903, Prince Mauritslaan 1). The design is Klinkhamer and Ouëndag.
Gravemarker of Gerardus Frederik Westerman (Amsterdam, ca. 1891)
Granary Korthals Altes

Gallery

Sources
 'Professor JF Klinkhamer † "in the Algemeen Handelsblad, 13 December 1928
 "Cremation Professor JF Riveter" in the Algemeen Handelsblad, 16 December 1928
 'Professor JF Klinkhamer deceased "in Time, 13 December 1928
Baalman D. (1992), Inventory of the archive JF Klinkhamer (1854-1928), Dutch Architecture Institute, Amsterdam

1854 births
1928 deaths
19th-century Dutch architects
20th-century Dutch architects
Architects from Amsterdam
Delft University of Technology alumni
Academic staff of the Delft University of Technology
Knights of the Order of the Netherlands Lion